Frances Klein, also known as Frances Siskin (October 19, 1915 – December 22, 2012), was an American jazz musician who began her career in the early 1930s. She played trumpet in a number of jazz bands (most notably the all-female bands led by Irene Vermillion and Ina Ray Hutton).

Biography 
Klein was a native of Cleveland, Ohio where she played trumpet in the Glenville High School Band. Around 1935 she was invited to play in Kermit Dart's All-Girl Band, which was led by Irene Vermillion. Klein traveled the country for two years with Vermillion's dance act/revue, "Rhapsody in Red." Upon returning to Cleveland, she was invited to tour with Ina Ray Hutton's Melodears; after which, she returned again to Cleveland where she performed in a variety of local venues as a part of the Cleveland Women's Orchestra. Around that time, she was also the sole female member of Freddie Shafer's band. Klein led a number of bands. On February 22, 1945, she married David Siskin and legally changed her name to Frances Siskin. In the late seventies, the Siskins moved to Jacksonville, Florida, where Klein continued playing trumpet in groups including the Jacksonville Bulls Pep Band, the Jacksonville Gator Pep Band, and a senior citizen's band known as High Society. She died in 2012 at the age of 97.

List of bands 
 Kermit Dart's All-Girl Band with Irene Vermillion
 Melodears
 Cleveland Women's Orchestra
 Frances Klein's All-Girl Orchestra
 Frances Klein and Her Formal Swingsters
 Frances Klein and Her Moderniers
 Frances Klein and Her Rhythm Boys
 United States Marine Band
 Frances Klein's All-Girl TV Band
 Jacksonville Bulls Pep Band
 Jacksonville Gator Pep Band

References

External links 
 Jazz Archive at Duke University
 Frances Klein Papers, 1929-2002, Rubenstein Rare Book and Manuscript Library, Duke University

1915 births
2012 deaths
American jazz trumpeters
American bandleaders
Melodears members